This is a list of real estate  in Dubai, United Arab Emirates.

Developments in Dubai 
 List of bridges and tunnels in Dubai
 List of buildings in Dubai
 List of tallest buildings in Dubai
 List of tallest residential buildings in Dubai
 List of communities in Dubai
 List of development projects in Dubai
 List of free-trade zones in Dubai
 List of hospitals in Dubai
 List of hotels in Dubai
 List of Industrial areas in Dubai
 List of parks in Dubai
 List of shopping malls in Dubai
 List of sports venues in Dubai
 List of universities and colleges in Dubai